Jack Frost, in comics, may refer to:
 Jack Frost (Marvel Comics), two Marvel Comics characters
 Jack Frost (manhwa), a Korean comic by Go Jin-ho
 Jack Frost (Vertigo), a character in Grant Morrison's The Invisibles
 Little Jack Frost, a title from Avon Comics
 Jack Frost (Fables), a character in Fables and Jack of Fables

See also
 Jack Frost (disambiguation)